Balaka, Malawi may refer to:

Balaka District in the Southern Region of Malawi
Balaka Township, Malawi, a township in the aforementioned district